Liga Tucumana de Fútbol is a football league based in Tucumán Province in Argentina.

It started in 1977 as a reorganised version of the Federación Tucumana de Fútbol (whose first championship was competed for in 1919) but is now effectively at the 6th level of the Argentine football league system, although prior to 1967 it was the main tournament for Tucumán teams. Between 1967-85 local teams were also able to qualify for the Nacional championship, and then in 1985 the current Argentine structure was put in place meaning the league was effectively demoted a number of levels. 

As of 2009 there are 36 teams competing in the league playing in 6 groups of six. This includes the following teams who in 2008–09 were also competing in one of the top 5 levels of the Argentine football system:

Atlético Tucumán, San Martín, La Florida, Concepción Fútbol Club, Atletico Famaillá, Atletico Concepción de Banda del Río Salí, Sportivo Guzmán, Amalia, Unión Tranviarios Automotor, Deportivo Aguilares and Ñuñorco.

In 2012 the four teams qualified for the semifinals were Amalia, Jorge Newbery, Lastenia and San Fernando.

The most successful teams have traditionally been San Martín and Atlético.

References

Tuc
Football in Tucumán Province
1977 establishments in Argentina
Sports leagues established in 1977